Racism in the Muslim world is a source of concern for people of color, particularly for Muslims of color. Black Muslims throughout the world report that racism is practiced against them by Arab Muslims, Asian Muslims, white Muslims, and other non-Black Muslims. In white-dominated countries such as the United States, the United Kingdom, Canada, and Australia, black Muslims and other Muslims of color may experience structural discrimination that White Muslims do not experience. In predominantly Arab Muslim countries, racism against Black Muslims and Asian Muslims is often ubiquitous. The oppression of Black Muslims in the Arab Muslim world is deeply connected to the long legacy of the Trans-Saharan slave trade and the Indian Ocean slave trade.

Issues
In Western societies, both white Muslims and Black Muslims may be used in a tokenistic way in institutional settings to emphasize the supposed diversity of a Muslim organization. White Muslims may be strategically placed "on the front stage for advertisement purposes". Black Muslims in France report that they are tokenized for diversity purposes in predominantly non-Black Muslim spaces that do not truly value or include Black Muslim voices.

Slavery

By country

Australia
White converts to Islam may enjoy white privileges that Muslims of color do not enjoy in Australia. White Muslims may be perceived as non-white if they are visibly Muslim, such as by wearing a hijab, but many white privileges would return if the white Muslim were to dress in a less visibly Islamic fashion. A white hijabi may receive less white privilege than a white non-hijabi due to the fact that Muslim identity is often racialized within Australian society.

Non-Black and white Muslims in Australia may use the N-word or other racial slurs, believing that because Australian Muslims are mostly brown and because Islam is a racialized religion, that the words are not offensive coming from Muslims.

According to Australian Muslim journalist Zahra Al-Hilaly, Black Muslims face racism that non-Black Muslims do not experience. She has written that she has racial privilege as a non-Black Arab Muslim and that "White Muslims are often praised and feted, but black Muslims do not receive the same reception, leadership roles or attention in the Muslim community."

Canada
Muslim Link, an online hub for Canadian Muslims, has published an "Anti-Racism Guide for White Muslims". While white Muslims experience Islamophobia in Canada, they may also benefit from white privilege in ways that Canadian Muslims of color do not experience. Some white Muslims may believe that because they are Muslim they are therefore incapable of being racist. According to Muslim Link's anti-racism guide, white Muslims "have been socialized as white people, with messages from our families, teachers, media and society about whiteness under an umbrella of white supremacy, both subtle and overt. We grew up without the lived experience of racism that People of Color have. This has both shaped and limited our understanding of racism."

United Arab Emirates
Black Muslim bloggers have criticized the exclusion of Black Muslims from the Dubai-based Modest Fashion Week.

United Kingdom
According to Dr. Amena Amer, a British Muslim lecturer, white British Muslims enjoy white privilege not afforded to non-white Muslims. White Muslims' "whiteness offers them an opportunity to distance themselves from extremism, a tactic unavailable to non-white Muslims." White Muslims suspected of involvement in terrorism are sometimes afforded more leniency or understanding than Muslims of South Asian or Middle Eastern heritage.

United States
Black Muslims in the United States experience the same anti-black racism that other black Americans face, as well as the same Islamophobia that other Muslim Americans face. Black Muslims also experience racism within predominantly non-black Muslim communities. Because Muslims are often racialized as Arab or South Asian in American society, black Muslims are often erased and made invisible. Black Muslims may experience racial discrimination in predominantly non-black Arab-American and South Asian-American mosques.

St. Louis, Missouri, has a legacy of anti-Black racism within white Muslim communities. While Bosnian Muslims experience a complicated relationship to whiteness, they are considered white by the US Census and may enjoy white privileges that Black residents of St. Louis may not enjoy. In 2014, a Bosniak-American named Zamir Begic was beaten to death with hammers. The murder caused shock in the Bosnian community of St. Louis and protests were held against violent crime. Because Begic was white and his suspected assailants were Black and Latino, some claimed that the murder of Begic was an example of "black-on-white" crime while others claimed it was a "a targeted attack on Bosnians". While the belief that Begic was targeted due to his ethnicity or race contributed to racial tensions between the Black community and white Muslims of Bosnian descent, St. Louis police did not believe the attack had any ethnic or racial basis.

See also
Antisemitism in the Arab world
Antisemitism in Christianity
Antisemitism in Islam
Christian views on slavery
Geography of antisemitism
History of antisemitism
History of the Jews under Muslim rule
History of slavery
History of slavery in the Muslim world
Islamic views on slavery
Jewish views on slavery
Racial antisemitism
Racism by country
Racism in Africa
Racism in Asia
Racism in Jewish communities
Religious antisemitism
Slavery and religion
Slavery in Africa
Slavery in Asia
Xenophobia and racism in the Middle East

References

Sources

External links
I’m Muslim and I Support BLM: Undoing Anti-Black Racism in Our Communities
Muslim Anti-Racism Collaborative

Intersectionality
Islamic culture
Racism
Religion and race